Kizirian's slender gecko (Hemiphyllodactylus kiziriani) is a species of gecko, a lizard in the family Gekkonidae. The species is endemic to Laos.

Etymology
The specific name, kiziriani, is in honor of American herpetologist David A. Kizirian.

Geographic range
H. kiziriani is known only from the type locality in Luang Prabang Province, northern Laos.

Habitat

Description

Reproduction
H. kiziriani is oviparous. Clutch size is two eggs.

References

Further reading
Nguyen, Truong Quang; Botov, Andreas; Le, Minh Duc; Nophaseud, Liphone; Zug, George; Bonkowski, Michael; Ziegler, Thomas (2014). "A new species of Hemiphyllodactylus (Reptilia: Gekkonidae) from northern Laos". Zootaxa 3827 (1): 045–046. (Hemiphyllodactylus kiziriani, new species).

Hemiphyllodactylus
Reptiles described in 2014
Endemic fauna of Laos
Reptiles of Laos